Leptolalax gracilis is a frog species in the family Megophryidae. It is endemic to northern Borneo: Brunei, Kalimantan (Indonesia), and Sarawak (Malaysia). Earlier record from the Malay Peninsula and Thailand refer to other species (at least Leptolalax platycephalus, an unnamed species, and possibly Leptolalax melanoleucus). Its natural habitats are tropical moist lowland forests, moist montane forests, and rivers. It is becoming rare due to habitat loss.

References

gracilis
Endemic fauna of Borneo
Amphibians of Brunei
Amphibians of Indonesia
Amphibians of Malaysia
Taxa named by Albert Günther
Amphibians described in 1872
Taxonomy articles created by Polbot
Taxobox binomials not recognized by IUCN
Amphibians of Borneo